A measure space is a basic object of measure theory, a branch of mathematics that studies generalized notions of volumes. It contains an underlying set, the subsets of this set that are feasible for measuring (the -algebra) and the method that is used for measuring (the measure). One important  example of a measure space is a probability space.

A measurable space consists of the first two components without a specific measure.

Definition

A measure space is a triple  where
  is a set
  is a -algebra on the set 
  is a measure on 

In other words, a measure space consists of a measurable space  together with a measure on it.

Example

Set . The -algebra on finite sets such as the one above is usually the power set, which is the set of all subsets (of a given set) and is denoted by  Sticking with  this convention, we set

In this simple case, the power set can be written down explicitly:

As the measure, define  by 

Important classes of measure spaces

Most important classes of measure spaces are defined by the properties of their associated measures. This includes
 Probability spaces, a measure space where the measure is a probability measure
 Finite measure spaces, where the measure is a finite measure
 -finite measure spaces, where the measure is a -finite measure

Another class of measure spaces are the complete measure spaces.

References

Measure theory
Space (mathematics)